Estoloides galapagoensis is a species of beetle in the family Cerambycidae. It was described by Blair in 1933. It is known from the Galápagos Islands.

References

Estoloides
Beetles described in 1933